Goodenia blackiana, commonly known as Black's goodenia, is a species of flowering plant in the family Goodeniaceae and is endemic to southern Australia. It is a herb with egg-shaped to lance-shaped leaves with the narrower end towards the base, and racemes of yellow flowers.

Description

Taxonomy and naming
Goodenia blackiana was first formally described in 1992 by Roger Charles Carolin in the Flora of Australia from material collected in the Grampians in 1953.

Distribution and habitat
This goodenia grows in mallee, woodland and grassland in scattered locations in western and northern Victoria and south-eastern South Australia.

References

blackiana
Flora of South Australia
Flora of Victoria (Australia)
Plants described in 1992
Taxa named by Roger Charles Carolin